Huddersfield Town's 1990–91 campaign was a very mediocre season for the Terriers, with Town finishing 11th in Eoin Hand's third season in charge. They finished only 4 places and 6 points off the play-offs.

Squad at the start of the season

Review
Following the departure of Craig Maskell to Reading during the close season, many Town fans were wondering where Town's goals were going to be coming from for the 1990–91 season. The answer seemed to be their new record signing from Watford, the Welsh international Iwan Roberts, signed for £275,000. In the early part of the season however, he only managed 3 goals in the first 13 league games, which actually made him Town's top scorer at the time along with Keith Edwards. But despite this, Town kept producing wins on a regular period and many still thought that the play-offs at least were still a realistic possibility.

Between November and March, Town were on a very impressive run of only 5 losses in 26 games, including 12 wins. Many of the goals did come from the boot of Iwan Roberts, as well as Kieran O'Regan, who each scored 14 goals in all competitions. Many still believed that Eoin Hand would lead Town to the play-offs and promotion to Division 2.

However, the last seven games saw Town lose four and win only one, which saw Town miss out on the play-offs by only 6 points and 4 places. Town were also awarded a record 14 penalties that season, but they only scored 9 of them, so the record of 11 penalties scored in a season, set in the 1983–84 season remained.

Squad at the end of the season

Results

Division Three

FA Cup

League Cup

Football League Trophy

Appearances and goals

1990–91
Huddersfield Town